The 1951 NAIA basketball tournament was held in March at Municipal Auditorium in Kansas City, Missouri. The 14th Annual NAIA basketball tournament featured 32 teams playing in a single-elimination format.

The championship game featured Hamline and Millikin. It was the first meeting between these two schools in tournament history. The Pipers of Hamline defeated the Big Blue of Millikin, 69–61.

The 1951 Tournament would be Hamline's 5th trip to the NAIA Final Four, and second tournament win, it was also Millikin's only trip to championship game, NAIA Final Four, and first of eventually four tournament berths. The other teams that rounded out the semifinals were Baldwin-Wallace and Regis. The Baldwin-Wallace Yellow Jackets defeated the Regis Rangers, 82–78.

Hamline's win put them on the leader board for most tournament champions with 3. A record that would last until Tennessee State would win in consecutive years. (1957, 1958, 1959.) Three Championships would be a tournament record until 1996 when Oklahoma City won its 4th Championship Title.

Awards and honors
Many of the records set by the 1951 tournament have been broken, and many of the awards were established much later:
Leading Scorer Award est. 1963
Leading Rebounder Award est. 1963
Charles Stevenson Hustle Award est. 1958
Coach of the Year est. 1954
Player of the Year est. 1994
All-time scoring leaders; second appearance: Lloyd Thorgaard, 10th, Hamline (Minn.) (1950,51,52,53), 15 games, 111 field goals,  61 free throws,  283 total points, 18.9 average per game; James Fritsche, 14th, Hamline (Minn.) (1950,51,52,53), 15 games, 113 field goals, 46 free throws,  272 total points, 18.1 average per game.

Bracket

  * denotes overtime.

See also
 1951 NCAA basketball tournament
 1951 National Invitation Tournament

References

NAIA Men's Basketball Championship
Tournament
NAIA men's basketball tournament
NAIA men's basketball tournament